Adelhamid Skander (Arabic: عبد الحميد اسكندر; born 13 May 1928) is an Algerian former professional footballer who played as a left winger.

Honours 
Bordeaux

 Coupe de France runner-up: 1954–55

References 

1928 births
Living people
Footballers from Oran
Algerian footballers
French footballers
French sportspeople of Algerian descent
Association football wingers

FC Girondins de Bordeaux players
FC Rouen players
Ligue 1 players
Ligue 2 players